MDAL is the chemical abbreviation of the psychedelic drug Methylenedioxyallylamphetamine.

MDAL or mdal may also refer to:

 M.D. Al., an alternative abbreviation for the United States District Court for the Middle District of Alabama
 MDAL, abbreviation for Mir Dostali railway station, in Pakistan
 mdal., abbreviation for mundartlich, the German concept of dialectic categorization in Helvetism